The  was an organization of the Empire of Japan.

It was founded in 1872 to train Kyodo Shoku or religious teachers because the Missionary Office and Department of Divinities were unsuccessful in their national indoctrination objectives. It was intended as a joint Shinto and Buddhist organization, but ended up becoming entirely dominated by Shinto.

On January 1, 1875, an arson attack on the Great Teaching Institute caused confusion, with four Jodo Shinshu sects informally announcing their departure from the Great Teaching Institute.

On May 3, 1875, the Great Teaching Institute was dissolved by the Ministry of Religion and was succeeded by the Bureau of Shinto Affairs and later Shinto Taikyo.

The "Great Teaching" is the same word that is used in the "Great Doctrine" or Proclamation of the Great Doctrine, and Taikyo in Shinto Taikyo

See also 

 Bureau of Shinto Affairs
 Shintō Taikyō
 Kyodo Shoku
 Sect Shinto

References

Bibliography 

 
 
 

 
 
 （文庫：1994年.ISBN 4886924603.）「教派神道に流れる古神道の本質」の章あり.

External links 

 Shinto Taikyo (sect of Shinto) 

Government agencies established in 1872
1875 disestablishments
Buddhism in the Meiji period
State Shinto
Defunct government agencies of Japan
Daikyoin